The 2006–07 Cupa României was the 69th season of the annual Romanian football knockout tournament.

The winners of the competition qualified for the First round of the 2007–08 UEFA Cup.

Round of 32

The matches were played on 24 and 25 October 2006.

|}

Round of 16

The matches were played on 7, 8 and 9 November 2006.

|}

Quarter-finals

The matches were played on February 28 and March 1, 2007.

|}

Semi-finals

The matches were played on April 18 and 19, 2007.

|}

Final

The final was played on May 26, 2007.

References

2006–07 in Romanian football
2006–07 domestic association football cups
2006-07